"Vienna Calling" is a song by Austrian musician Falco, released in September 1985 (and in 1986 in Anglophone markets) as the second single from his third studio album, Falco 3 (1985).

Background 
The song was written by Falco and Dutch music producers Bolland & Bolland.

The rapped German-language lyrics tells about Falco's hometown of Vienna, its development and lifestyle. On the one hand, reference is made to the increasingly international environment of the city and the telephone as a rapid means of communication;  the question "where are your wives?" ("wohin sind deine Frau'n?") is also asked, suggesting that they are elsewhere; this culminates at the end of the song with the alarm being "red" and "Vienna in need" ("Wien in Not"). For example, the first verse tells of a woman named Stella who "sits" in Rio and "lies" in Tokyo, to indicate that she is not at home when she is called.   

The fast pop-rap song is accompanied by a flute motif and a bluesy, clean guitar. Some samples ("hello") are also used, which support the telephone theme. At the end the flute plays a solo.

Falco enjoyed a limited international success with "Vienna Calling" in late 1985, following the worldwide hit of his previous single "Rock Me Amadeus". In addition to reaching the top 10 in several European countries, it also made the top 20 in New Zealand, Canada, and the United States.

Music video
The accompanying music video, directed by Frank Alchezcar and Rudi Dolezal, features Austrian actress Brigitta Cimarolli. The video shows Falco performing the song with lip sync in a traditional Austrian bar, while other people dance a choreography. Continuity is occasionally cut with scenes of phone calls, including Falco calling insistently in a telephone booth in the bar.

Charts

Weekly charts

Year-end charts

References

1985 singles
1985 songs
1986 singles
A&M Records singles
Falco (musician) songs
German-language songs
Songs about Vienna
Songs written by Falco (musician)
Songs written by Ferdi Bolland
Songs written by Rob Bolland